Anderson Thiago de Souza (born 13 July 1984 in Brazill), known as just Thiago, is a Brazilian retired footballer.

Career

After playing for Brazilian lower league sides Sport Club Corinthians Alagoano, Rio Branco Esporte Clube, and União São João Esporte Clube, de Souza signed for Borussia Dortmund, one of Germany's most successful teams. In his first season there, 2003/04, he was one of 7 Brazilians and failed to make an appearance for the club, before joining LA Galaxy in the American top flight, making 3 league appearances there. From LA Galaxy, de Souza stent the rest of his career in the Brazilian lower leagues.

References

External links
 Anderson Thiago de Souza at Sambafoot

Brazilian footballers
Living people
Association football forwards
1984 births
Batatais Futebol Clube players
Clube Atlético Votuporanguense players
Associação Atlética Aparecidense players
Associação Esportiva Santacruzense players